Prabhu Narayan Singh  (26 November 1855 – 4 August 1931) was ruler of the Benares State (Royal House of Benares), an Indian princely state, from 1889 to 1931.
Prabhu Narayan Singh would reign for 42 years as Maharaja; in 1891, he was knighted with the KCIE, later becoming an honorary colonel in the Indian Army. 

In 1911, he became the first Maharaja of the newly created princely state of Benares, including the parganas of Bhadohi and Keramnagar, Chakia, and Ramnagar, together with certain limited rights within the City of Benares. He was appointed Knight Commander of the Order of the Indian Empire (KCIE) in 1892, Knight Grand Commander of the Order of the Indian Empire (GCIE) in 1898, and Knight Grand Commander of the Order of the Star of India (GCSI) for his services in the First World War in the 1921 New Year Honours.  He donated 1300 acres of land to establish famous Banaras Hindu University. He donated land at Kamacha, Varanasi to Dr. Annie Basent for the establishment of Hindu College which she donated for the establishment of BHU. Donated charity for digging a well at drought-stricken village of Oxford, still known as Maharaja's well. He was a great scholar and well versed in Sanskrit, Persian, and English. Established Iswari Memorial Hospital for reducing mother-child mortality during childbirth. Continued the tradition of Saint Kings and got operated on without Anesthesia by going into Yog-Samadhi. Ascending to Baikunth(divine abode) in 1931, aged 75, Maharaja Sir Prabhu Narayan was succeeded by his only son, Sir Aditya Narayan Singh.

Titles
1855–1889: Maharaj Prabhu Narayan Singh
1889–1891: His Highness Maharajadhiraja Sri Prabhu Narayan Singh Sahib Bahadur, Kashi Naresh, Maharaja of Benares
1891–1898: His Highness Maharajadhiraja Sri Sir Prabhu Narayan Singh Sahib Bahadur, Kashi Naresh, Maharaja of Benares, KCIE 
1898–1919: His Highness Maharajadhiraja Sri Sir Prabhu Narayan Singh Sahib Bahadur, Kashi Naresh, Maharaja of Benares, GCIE 
1919–1921: Lieutenant-Colonel His Highness Maharajadhiraja Sri Sir Prabhu Narayan Singh Sahib Bahadur, Kashi Naresh, Maharaja of Benares, GCIE
1921–1931: Lieutenant-Colonel His Highness Maharajadhiraja Sri Sir Prabhu Narayan Singh Sahib Bahadur, Kashi Naresh, Maharaja of Benares, GCSI, GCIE

Honours
Knight Grand Commander of the Order of the Indian Empire (GCIE) – 1898  (KCIE – 1891)
Delhi Durbar Gold Medal – 1903
Delhi Durbar Gold Medal – 1911
Knight Grand Commander of the Order of the Star of India (GCSI) – 1921
Grand Cross of the Order of Leopold II of Belgium – 1926

Footnotes

References
Obituary, The Times, 5 August 1931

1855 births
1931 deaths
Maharajas of Benares
Knights Grand Commander of the Order of the Star of India
Knights Grand Commander of the Order of the Indian Empire
Narayan dynasty
Recipients of the Grand Cross of the Order of Leopold II
History of Varanasi